Balneatrix alpica is a bacterium from the genus of Balneatrix which is associated with pneumonia and meningitis in rare cases.

References

Oceanospirillales
Bacteria described in 1993